Golden Sands is a 1984 Icelandic comedy film directed by Ágúst Guðmundsson, starring Arnar Jónsson, Edda Björgvinsdóttir and Pálmi Gestsson. It tells the story of a rumor about gold being hidden in the sands of south coast Iceland, which causes turbulence for the local community. The film was released in Icelandic cinemas on 26 December 1984.

Cast
 Arnar Jónsson
 Edda Björgvinsdóttir
 Pálmi Gestsson
 Björgvin Halldórsson as Helgi Somi
 Jón Sigurbjörnsson
 Borgar Garðarsson
 Gestur Einar Jónasson
 Sigurður Sigurjónsson
 Ómar Ragnarsson
 Þórhallur Sigurðsson
 Haraldur Sigurðsson

References

1984 comedy films
Films directed by Ágúst Guðmundsson
Icelandic comedy films
1980s Icelandic-language films